Zhang Yinwu; 1891 – May 27, 1949) was a Kuomintang educator and politician of the Republic of China. He was born in Baoding, Hebei. He was a graduate of the Baoding Military Academy. He was the 17th Republican mayor of Beijing. After the capture of Beijing (called Beiping at the time) by the forces of the Communist Party of China, he was arrested by the People's Liberation Army in February 1949 and jailed. He died 3 months later in prison.

Bibliography
 
 
 
 

1891 births
1949 deaths
Republic of China politicians from Hebei
Baoding Military Academy alumni
Educators from Hebei
Mayors of Beijing
Chinese people who died in prison custody
Politicians from Baoding
Prisoners who died in Chinese detention